Albyric Drummond-Willoughby, 3rd Baron Gwydyr, 23rd Baron Willoughby de Eresby (25 December 1821 – 26 August 1870), was a British noble baron. He was the son of Peter Drummond-Burrell, 22nd Baron Willoughby de Eresby (died 1865), and Sarah Clementina, née Drummond (died 1865). He never married.

On his father's death in 1865, he succeeded him as Baron Willoughby de Eresby, Baron Gwydyr, Baronet Burrell of Knipp and joint (1/2) hereditary Lord Great Chamberlain. On his death the Willoughby barony fell into abeyance between his two sisters; the abeyance was later terminated in favour of the elder one, Clementina, who became the 24th Baroness. The joint hereditary Lord Great Chamberlainship was split equally between the two sisters, each holding one quarter. The Gwydyr barony was inherited by his cousin, Peter Burrell, who became the 4th Baron Gwydyr.

His tomb, alongside that of his nephew Gilbert Heathcote-Drummond-Willoughby, 1st Earl of Ancaster (d. 1910), is to the rear of the Church of St Michael and All Angels at Edenham in Lincolnshire. Together, the tombs are Grade II listed.

References

23
Albyric
1821 births
1870 deaths